Mohammad Mazharul Haque Chowdhuri (3 July 1980 – 3 April 2013) was a Bangladeshi cricketer who played in one One Day International in 2002.  He was born in Narayanganj, Dhaka.

References

1980 births
2013 deaths
Bangladesh One Day International cricketers
Bangladeshi cricketers
Dhaka Division cricketers
People from Narayanganj District